Ċ (minuscule: ċ) is a letter of the Latin alphabet, formed from C with the addition of a dot.

Usage

Chechen
Ċ is present in the Chechen Latin alphabet, created in the 1990s. The Cyrillic equivalent is ЦӀ, which represents the sound .

Irish
Ċ was formerly used in Irish to represent the lenited form of C. The digraph ch, which is older than ċ in this function in Irish, is now used.

Maltese
Ċ is the third letter of the Maltese alphabet, preceded by B and followed by D. It represents the voiceless postalveolar affricate .

Old English
Its voiced equivalent is Ġ.

Computer encoding

References

Maltese language
Latin letters with diacritics
Phonetic transcription symbols